Hannah L. Buxbaum (born 1966) is vice president for international affairs at Indiana University. She is a professor at the Indiana University Maurer School of Law in Bloomington, Indiana, where she holds the John E. Schiller Chair in Legal Ethics. She was appointed vice president for international affairs in 2018. From 2015-2018, she served as the inaugural academic director of the IU Europe Gateway in Berlin.

Buxbaum graduated cum laude from Cornell University in 1987 and earned a J.D. magna cum laude from its law school in 1992. She also received an LL.M summa cum laude from the University of Heidelberg in 1993. She joined the law school faculty in 1997 after practicing in the area of international securities transactions in the New York and Frankfurt offices of Davis Polk & Wardwell. From January 2012 through December 2013, she served as the law school's interim dean. She teaches and writes in the area of private international law and international litigation and jurisdiction.

Selected works

Books

 TRANSNATIONAL BUSINESS PROBLEMS (with Detlev Vagts, William Dodge and Harold Koh) (Foundation Press 5th ed. 2014).
 A CONFLICT-OF-LAWS ANTHOLOGY (second edition) (with Gene R. Shreve) (LexisNexis 2d. ed. 2012).

Articles

 Determining the Territorial Scope of State Law in Interstate and International Conflicts: Comments on the Draft Restatement (Third) and on the Role of Party Autonomy, 27 DUKE J. COMP. & INT'L. L. 381 (2017).
 Transnational Legal Ordering and Regulatory Conflict: Lessons From the Regulation of Cross-Border Derivatives, 1 U.C. IRVINE J. INT'L., TRANSNAT'L & COMP. L. (2017).
 Foreign Governments as Plaintiffs in U.S. Courts and the Case Against "Judicial Imperialism," 73 WASH. & LEE L. REV. 653 (2016).
 The Viability of Enterprise Jurisdiction: A Case Study of the Big Four Accounting Firms, 48 U.C. DAVIS L. REV. 1769 (2015).

References

External links 

 IU Europe Gateway in Berlin, Office of the Vice President for International Affairs

Living people
Indiana University faculty
Cornell Law School alumni
American legal scholars
Davis Polk & Wardwell lawyers
1966 births